Arctinurus boltoni is a large (up to 30 cm) lichid trilobite of the mid-Silurian. This trilobite reached about eight inches in length, though the normal adult carapace was about four inches. It lived in moderately deep-water in semi-tropical regions.  Arctinurus fossils have been found in Europe and North America.

Arctinurus was first reported during the construction of the Erie Canal through soft Silurian shales and mudstones in upstate New York. Before the late 1990s, complete Arctinurus fossils were very rare. The vast majority of complete specimens were commercially mined near Middleport New York, USA, in a shallow quarry in the Rochester Formation, and the trilobite is now relatively common in museum, university and private collections. Arctinurus tended to have epibionts attached to the carapace.

References

 
 

Lichida
Silurian trilobites of Europe
Fossils of the United States
Silurian trilobites of North America
Jeffersonville Limestone
Paleozoic life of Ontario
Paleozoic life of Manitoba
Paleozoic life of Quebec